Serhiy Mykhailovych Marchenko (born 24 January 1981) is a Ukrainian economist and politician currently serving as Minister of Finance of Ukraine since 30 March 2020. Previously, he has served as Deputy Minister of Finance of Ukraine from 2016 to 2018 and as Deputy Head of the Presidential Administration of Ukraine from 2018 to 2019.

Early life and education
In 2002 Marchenko graduated from the State Tax Service Academy with the Master's degree in Public Finance Management (diploma with honours, the President of Ukraine scholar in 2001–2002).

In 2009 Marchenko obtained a PhD degree in economics (Candidate of Economic Sciences).

Career
Starting from 2002 Marchenko worked on several positions in the Ministry of Finance, State Tax Administration, Finance and Banking Committee and the Secretariat of Cabinet of Ministers.

In 2011 Marchenko participated in the Management and Leadership Program at Harvard Kennedy School, and he began his work at the Presidential Coordination Center of Reforms Implementation. He participated in Budget Code development. The Code was adopted in 2014. This Code is important particularly because of fiscal decentralization reform. Mr. Marchenko coordinated the preparation of a package of legislative bills aimed at changing the budgeting and improvement of autonomy of healthcare institutions.

Starting 2014, he worked as an expert for Bendukidze Free Market Center and developed a concept of the Program of Leadership in Public Finance and then implemented it with Kyiv school of economics in 2015–2016.

From 2016 to 2018 he worked as Deputy Minister of Finance.

From 2018 to 2019 Marchenko held the position of Deputy Head of the Presidential Administration.

In the 2019 Ukrainian parliamentary election Marchenko was number 7 on the election list of the party Ukrainian Strategy of Groysman. The party failed to win any seats.

Member of the NSDC since 7 April 2020.

On 30th Match 2020 was appointed as a Minister of Finance of Ukraine.

In July 2020 as a Minister of Finance he was ranked No. 4 in Top-40 most influential young politicians in Ukraine according to Correspondent magazine.

In 2023, Marchenko is Chairman of the Board of Governors of the International Monetary Fund and the World Bank.

Since 26th January 2023, Marchenko is co-chairman of the Multi-Agency Donor Coordination Platform for Ukraine.

Other activities
 World Bank, Ex-Officio Member of the Board of Governors (since 2020)

Personal life
Marchenko is married and has two children.

He is interested in triathlon, participated in three starts of Ironman 70.3 or "Half Ironman" (1.9 km of swimming, 90 km of cycling and 21 km of running), two of them – in Turkey and Finland – he finished successfully. In Portugal, he was injured during a cycling and therefore could not finish the distance.

See also 
 Shmygal Government

References

External links 

 

1981 births
Living people
People from Kyiv Oblast
Finance ministers of Ukraine
21st-century  Ukrainian economists
21st-century Ukrainian politicians
National Security and Defense Council of Ukraine